Irvington High School is an American public secondary school located in the Irvington district of Fremont, California, United States. It is one of the five public high schools in the Fremont Unified School District. Since 2012, Irvington has received full accreditation from the Western Association of Schools and Colleges.

Campus
The  campus is located in the Irvington district. Opened in 1961, it underwent major construction in 1968, resulting in the addition of a 150-seat theater, a second gymnasium, and ten and a half classrooms. Irvington underwent further campus beautification in 2009, with the installation of the prototypical solar panel on the southwest corner and re-sodding of the varsity and JV baseball fields. In the summer of 2010, further improvements were made to the main parking lot on the east side of campus. A two-story building was added in 2016 for math and science classes.

Academics
Irvington is a National Blue Ribbon School and California Distinguished School. In April 2017 U.S. News & World Report ranked Irvington as 78th in California, 468th in the United States, and 66th in the United States for STEM (Science, Technology, Engineering, and Mathematics). 63% of Irvington students take at least one Advanced Placement (AP) exam, and 88% score a passing score of 3 or above. In 2013, Irvington's API score was 884. Its API score for 2012 was 874. Its API score for 2011 was 869.

Awards
California Distinguished School
National Blue Ribbon School
New American High School
America's Greenest School
Ladies' Home Journal Ten Most Amazing Schools in the United States
Civic Learning Award of Excellence

Benchmarks
Students must complete special benchmark projects at Irvington. Currently, IHS has three benchmarks, one at the 9th grade level called Change Project, one at the 10th grade level called World Issues Project, and one at the 12th grade level called QUEST. Benchmarks are long-term projects that allow students to demonstrate progress toward or mastery of the four School-Wide Outcomes: Communication, Critical Thinking, Personal Responsibility, and Social Responsibility. Benchmarks are intended to be consistently evaluated, "authentic," real life assessment projects which provide students, parents, and teachers information about student achievement across a range of important lifelong learning skills.

CHANGE Project
Freshmen complete a "Change" project in which they become introduced to the Irvington culture by working in teams of three to four to make a positive change regarding an environmental problem that they identify in the local community. They have approximately six months to complete the service project, volunteer at a local organization, write three drafts of a research report, and create a Powerpoint presentation to present near the end of the school year to their peers and teachers.

World Issues Project
Formerly known as "UN", World Issues adds a service component to Irvington education. Changes have been made to the process and objective of the project. Now, students are put into groups of four and are assigned a global issue. After covering a background of the issue in a group, students complete the rest of the project individually. The first half of the year is devoted to understanding and describing the issue, and the second half is spent proposing ways to fix the problem. Each student must research their assigned issue, write two papers on their topic,  and participate in two discussions on their assigned topic. These topics include lack of access to clean water, refugee crisis, terrorism, child labor, climate change, infectious diseases, and inequality for women.

QUEST Project
QUEST is a five-component project designed and must be completed by all Irvington seniors in order to graduate. If all the components are not completed, the student will not graduate. QUEST benchmark was established in 1996. The student starts with a "Question," associated with "providing benefits to the community." Through "Understanding," an answer to the Question starts to develop through research, reading, writing, and hands-on activities. Students must then find a professional to act as their consultant and guide them through their experience and service hours. The student and his or her consultant then create an "Experience" plan related to the Question, which may include a variety of jobs that the student-chosen jobs that relate to the Question. Through "Service," the student designs and implements an activity which will allow the student to share his or her new knowledge with the greater community in a way that serves a real need in the community. They must write a paper consisting of all their findings throughout the year presenting their social contemporary issue with background information, research, and hands on experience on their QUEST topic. Finally, at the "Testimony," the student will present his or her entire QUEST experience to a panel consisting of staff, parents and experienced community members.

Demographics

According to U.S. News & World Report, 84% of Irvington's student body is "of color," with 13% of the student body coming from economically disadvantaged households, determined by student eligibility for California's reduced-price meal program. 5.23% of Irvington's students are English Language Learners.

Attendance area
The attendance area includes the Fremont districts of Irvington, Warm Springs, and part of Mission San Jose. Along with Irvington High School, the attendance area also includes six elementary schools — Grimmer, Harvey Green, Hirsch, James Leitch, Warm Springs, and Weibel, as well as Horner Middle School.  Students choosing to enter the high school who live outside the district lines may apply for a lottery or a transfer into the Irvington Arts Magnet Program. Applying for the Center For The Creative Arts Program (CCA) is an art-oriented method of getting in the school if a student does not live within the boundaries. CCA has modified English, social studies, and science classes that are grouped together in a family that includes more artistic guidelines. In the early 2000's this boundary used to be Grimmer, Harvey Green, Hirsch, James Leitch, Forest Park, Warm Springs, and Millard. Weibel was later added to the attendance area to improve school performance and academics.

Extracurricular

Athletics

The Vikings Baseball Program had back to back NCS appearances in 2016 and 2017, after not having any playoff appearances in the prior 5 seasons.
They also had 10 players move on to play college baseball during the last 5 seasons and continue to have a remarkable GPA as a team.
In addition, Mark Mathias, a 2012 graduate, is currently in the Milwaukee Brewers organization and had a great chance to break camp with the team prior to the COVID 19 shut down.
 Irvington's varsity baseball program has been strong over the last twenty-four years, placing first in league in 2008 and winning an MVAL title in 2009. In recent years, the JV baseball program has won two league titles and placed second twice.
Irvington's badminton team has placed second and third in the MVAL between 2005-2010. It placed second at the 2006 NCS tournament. That same year, the badminton team won second place in the MVALs.
Irvington's cross country team often places high at MVALs. During the 2005-2006 season, the boys' varsity team placed second at the MVAL championships, and during the 2006-2007 season, the girls' varsity team placed second at the MVAL championships. Varsity and JV girls were 07-08 and 08-09 MVAL Champions, and varsity girls placed fourth at NCS. However, in recent years (2009 and 2010), the varsity team has been lacking, with a fifth place (out of seven) finish at the 2010 MVAL finals.
Irvington's varsity football team took first place in the MVALs in 2005, beating out top competitor Logan High School in Union City, and moving on to the NCS finals. They took second place in 2006 MVALs and moved on to the NCS semi-finals. Robert Turbin (RB), who played during this period, was selected in the NFL Draft by the Seattle Seahawks.
Irvington's volleyball team made it to NCS in the 2008-2009 season, eventually losing to Mission San Jose High School. The team also qualified for NCS in the 2009-2010 season, but lost to Liberty in the first round. In the 2010-2011 season, the team took first in the MVAL, and made it past the first round of NCS, beating San Leandro, but lost to California High School in the second round.
Irvington's 2018 boys' water polo team tied for first place in the MVAL and made it into the NCS tournament. Two players were named First Team All-League and one player was named the MVAL League MVP.
Irvington's varsity tennis team placed second in MVALs for four years in a row. The tennis team has made it to NCS twice.
Irvington's 2009 gymnastics team was undefeated during the regular season, becoming the season champions. At MVALs, Irvington placed first overall, with an Irvington gymnast taking first overall in each of the three levels: JV, varsity, and varsity elite.
Irvington's 2016 gymnastics team was undefeated.
Irvington's 2016/17 Varsity soccer team remained undefeated, winning every single game, resulting in a first-place finish in MVAL, for the first time in over 40 years. The 14 game winning streak finally came to an end when Irvington played De La Salle in the NCS playoffs where they lost 2-0.
Irvington's 2018 boys' volleyball team placed first in the MVAL and subsequently placed first in the Division 1 NCS. The team also won multiple tournaments and placed in another.
Irvington’s boys’ soccer team won back to back NCS championships in 1997 (3-0 vs Logan HS) and in 1998 (2-1 in 3 OT vs De La Salle HS).

Band
Irvington has six concert band groups on campus: a freshman symphonic band, two symphonic bands, an orchestra, and two wind ensembles. Irvington also has a jazz ensemble which meets before school during zero period and several independent ensembles on campus. Wind ensembles have earned the prestigious Unanimous Superior ranking at multiple CMEA competitions. In addition, wind ensembles frequently send their members to California's All-State Honor Band and Northern California's All-Northern Honor Band. The entire ensemble was invited to perform at the Chabot Invitational since 2007. A wind ensemble placed first in the Class A concert competition at the 2007 Lincoln Tournament of Champions. In 2013, freshman symphonic band received unanimous superior during the CMEA Band Festival.

Irvington's marching band was composed of approximately 186 members during the year of 2013–2014 and has been steadily growing. During the 2014–2015 season, the band consisted of almost 250 members. In 2005, the marching band won first place in the Division B competition at the Tournament of Champions at Lincoln High School in Stockton. The color guard also took first place at Lincoln as well as at the 35th Annual Santa Cruz Band Review. In 2006, the marching band and color guard took second place for Division B at Lincoln. In 2007, the marching band and color guard took second place again for Division B at Lincoln, and the drum major placed 3rd in the Mace category. Irvington finished the 2009 season capturing first place in Marching Band, first place in Concert Band (wind ensemble), and third place overall in Drumline at the Tournament of Champions at Lincoln High School in Stockton. In 2011, the marching band and color guard took sweepstakes in three of four categories competing in Division AA including music, showmanship, and overall parade. The color guard took first place in Division AA, and the drum major placed 2nd in the Mace category. The 2011 accomplishments at the Lincoln Tournament of Champions were the highest ever achieved by the Irvington marching band and color guard in the history of Irvington. In 2012, Irvington also took sweepstakes at the Feste Del Mar Band Review, with a score of 92.6. In 2012, the color guard also took sweepstakes at the Tournament of Champions at Lincoln High School in Stockton, and in 2014, the marching band took parade sweepstakes with a score of 92.55, beating Golden Valley, who are well known for their marching band and consistently place highly at band reviews. Owing to a large number of students in the marching band, it was split into two, JV and varsity, with auditions required to join varsity. At the 2017 Lincoln Band Review varsity marching band received music and overall sweepstakes. At the 2018 Santa Cruz Boardwalk band review Varsity Marching band earned overall and music sweepstakes. In 2022, the JV marching band took 1st place in Division 6A at the Tournament of Champions at Lincoln High School in Stockton. The same year, the varsity marching band finished the season undefeated, winning 4 or more sweepstakes at every band review, including overall parade sweepstakes and music sweepstakes at every single one.

Irvington's Marching Band also has an active drumline. In 2005, the drumline placed fourth at the Lincoln Tournament of Champions. In 2007, the drumline again placed fourth at the Lincoln Tournament of Champions and fifth at the Santa Cruz Boardwalk band review. In 2009, the drumline placed sixth at the Santa Cruz Boardwalk band review and second at the Lodi Grape Bowl Classic Band Review. They finished the 2009 season placing third overall at the Lincoln Tournament of Champions. In 2011, the drumline placed third overall at the Tournament of Champions. In 2012, drumline placed first overall at the Santa Cruz Band Review.

Journalism
Irvington's school newspaper, The Voice, reaches over 2,000 students a month. It contains seven sections (News, Student Life, Opinions, Arts and Entertainment, Sports, Humor, and Photos) and is the only school newspaper in the Fremont Unified School District to have a Humor section.

The journalism class is advised by English teacher Matthew Phillips. The staff is composed of over 25 students, with one or two editors for each section, a business manager, and two editors-in-chief.

Their website, redesigned in 2014, contains online editions of the paper as well as regular news and school updates. The Voice also has a broadcast news channel, VTV, and an Instagram account (@ihsvoice) that documents daily life on campus. The website is currently headed by a single web editor.

Lamda
Irvington houses a Lamda program named the Irvington Conservatory Theater in the Valhalla theater. The school holds a partnership with the local community college, Ohlone College. Recent productions include:
A Midsummer Night’s Dream - fall 2022 
You're a Good Man, Charlie Brown - spring 2022
A Wrinkle in Time - fall 2021
The Theory of Relativity (streaming due to covid-19) - spring 2021
The Laramie Project (streaming due to covid-19) - fall 2020
Seussical (cancelled due to covid-19) - spring 2020
Peter and the Starcatcher - fall 2019
Oliver Twist - spring 2019
She Kills Monsters - fall 2018
Fiddler On The Roof - spring 2018
As You Like It - fall 2017
Wizard of Oz - spring 2017
It's a Wonderful Life - fall 2016
Urinetown - spring 2016
Almost, Maine - fall 2015
Into the Woods - spring 2015
Out of the Frying Pan - fall 2014
Anything Goes - spring 2014
A Midsummer Night's Dream - fall 2013
Bye Bye Birdie - spring 2013
The Diviners - fall 2012
Beauty and the Beast - spring 2012
Moon Over Buffalo - fall 2011
Starmites - spring 2011
A Christmas Carol - fall 2010
Aida - spring 2010
The Hobbit - fall 2009
Grease - spring 2009
Alice in Wonderland - fall 2008
Footloose - spring 2008
A Midsummer Night's Dream - fall 2007
Seussical - spring 2007
Wind in the Willows - fall 2006
Little Shop of Horrors - spring 2006
A Christmas Carol - fall 2005
Kiss Me, Kate - spring 2005
Cinderella - fall 2004
Once on This Island - spring 2004

Robotics
The Irvington High School Robotics Club, founded in February 2010, is an information technology club. The club's first-time participation in the 2010 Northern California Botball Tournament held in San Mateo earned first place in the Alliance Competition and won a plaque for Outstanding Documentation.

In the fall of 2010, the club expanded from a single competition team to three teams: Team Bluescreens, EndOfLines, and the Red HoloRAMs. In its first year of participation, the Red HoloRAMs dominated the FIRST Tech Challenge Regional Qualifiers, winning first place in the Fremont Qualifier. All teams advanced to the 2011 Northern California FTC Championships, winning eighth, 10th, and 19th place out of 26 teams.

The club returned to Botball in the spring of 2011, with Team Bluescreens winning the Judge's Choice Award for Most Creative Design for using an "Omni-wheel" for steering its robot. EndOfLines won second place in the Alliance Competition.

In fall 2011, the newly formed Team Terrorbotics received second place at Brentwood qualifications. They advanced to regionals, placing 19th.

As of 2012, Team Bluescreens won first place at the Brentwood qualifiers. Team EndOfLines was replaced by Team NuclearEndermen.

As of 2015, Team Bluescreens (split into subteams A and B) is the only competition team remaining in the club, and has withdrawn from FTC. For the current season, the team is participating in the VEX competition.

In the fall of 2016, the club decided to form two VEX competition teams, one regular team and one "varsity" team, which utilizes techniques taught in Project Lead the Way's engineering courses.

In February 2018, the club hosted its first-ever VEX Robotics Competition qualifier, the winner of which qualified for the Northern California state championships.

The club also makes annual trips to Maker Faire, which are highly anticipated within the club.

On occasion, the club has hosted the FIRST LEGO League competitions on campus.

Student life 
On June 12, 2017, the Senior prank required seniors to clean up for preventing vandalism.

On May 4, 2019, MechA's Mr. IHS celebrated 10th anniversary of success. The performance ended over an hour late at 10:40pm instead of 9:30pm, and most of the audience remained in anticipation to hear the final winner.

Notable alumni 

 Noah Delgado, professional soccer player
 PJ Hirabayashi, musician
 Kupono Low, professional soccer player
 Dick Ruthven, former Major League Baseball player
 Alberto Torrico, politician
 Robert Turbin, NFL running back

References

External links
Irvington High School home page
Fremont Unified School District home page
Irvington High School Robotics home page

Educational institutions established in 1961
Fremont Unified School District
High schools in Alameda County, California
Schools in Fremont, California
Public high schools in California
1961 establishments in California